Benjamin Bernard Selvin (March 5, 1898 – July 15, 1980) was an American musician, bandleader, and record producer. He was known as the Dean of Recorded Music.

Selvin was born in New York City, United States, the son of Jewish Russian immigrants. He started his professional life at age 15 as a fiddle player in New York City night clubs. Six years later, as leader of his own dance band, the Novelty Orchestra, he released what was later alleged to be the biggest-selling popular song in the first quarter-century of recorded music. "Dardanella" allegedly sold more than six million copies and an additional million pieces of sheet music—although in a joint interview with Gustave Haenschen, founding director of popular-music releases at Brunswick Records, Selvin described the alleged record-sales total as “nonsensical” and said the actual sales of “Dardanella” and other purported “million-sellers” in the 1920s was 150,000 discs. He was awarded a gold disc by the Recording Industry Association of America (RIAA) that was presented to Selvin on his retirement on March 14, 1963.

According to The Guinness Book of World Records, Selvin recorded more musical sides (on 78-rpm discs) than any other person. One reason for this prolific output is that he recorded for dozens of different record labels during this productive time in the industry, using a different name for each label. His output has been estimated at 13,000 to 20,000 song titles.

1919–1927
Selvin started recording for Victor in 1919.  He proceeded to record for almost all record companies at the time including Paramount, OKeh, Emerson, Lyric, Arto, Cardnal, Vocalion, Pathe, Federal, Brunswick, Grey Gull, Banner (and the related dime store labels), and Columbia.  From 1922 to 1925, over half of his records were on Vocalion, but he apparently did not have an exclusive contract with any of these labels until he signed with Columbia in 1927.

Columbia
From 1927 to 1934 Selvin was artists and repertoire (A&R) director for Columbia Records, where his many productions included musicians Mannie Klein, Benny Goodman, Tommy Dorsey, Jimmy Dorsey, Joe Venuti, Eddie Lang, and Bunny Berigan. Many of these recordings are collectable and prized (especially those recorded in 1931–1934).

There were incorrect reports that Ben Selvin's Band played under the name "Perley Stevens and his Orchestra". Perley Stevens occasionally played with Ben Selvin's Band and many others, including Jimmy and Tommy Dorsey Orchestras and Paul Whiteman's Band. During the Columbia era, Selvin recorded under many different names (for Columbia, OKeh, Odeon, Parlophone, Harmony, Diva, Velvet Tone, and Clarion) including:

 The Broadway Nitelites
 The Knickerbockers
 The Columbians
 The Cavaliers
 The Radiolites
 Barney Trimble and his Oklahomans
 Jerry Mason and his Californians
 The Harmonians
 Rudy Marlow and his Orchestra
 Columbia Photo Players
 Frank Auburn and his Orchestra
 Kolster Dance Orchestra
 Lloyd Keating and his Music
 Earl Marlow and his Orchestra
 Ed Loyd and his Orchestra
 Ray Seeley and his Orchestra
 Sam Nash and his Orchestra
 Mickie Alpert and his Orchestra
 Johnny Walker and his Orchestra
 Chester Leighton and his Sophomores
 Wally Edwards and his Orchestra
 Roy Carroll and his Sands Point Orchestra
 Buddy Campbell and his Orchestra
 Golden Terrace Orchestra
 Bar Harbor Society Orchestra
 Ted Raph and his Orchestra
 Georgia Moonlight Serenaders
 Cloverdale Country Club Orchestra
 Ed Parker and his Orchestra
 Jerry Fenwyck and his Orchestra

After Columbia
Under his own name, Selvin had accepted an exclusive contract to Brunswick Records when the company’s management decided to venture into radio with “The Brunswick Hour”, under the direction of Gus Haenschen. When it became clear to Brunswick’s management that an urgent need existed for pre-recorded music programming for smaller radio stations unable to afford their own orchestras, Brunswick’s general manager William A. Brophy agreed with the recommendations of his assistant secretary Percy L. Deutsch, popular-music director Haenschen, and arranger-conductor Frank Black to  develop a library of high-quality recorded music for leasing to smaller radio stations. The new venture was called the World Broadcasting System, with newly-constructed recording facilities in Manhattan called Sound Studios, Inc. Haenschen persuaded Selvin to leave Brunswick to accept an offer from Columbia Records to become the company’s Artists and Repertoire director while also serving as a silent partner in the World Broadcasting venture. 

Selvin, who was known for his ability to write orchestral arrangements rapidly and to oversee multiple recording sessions, became a central figure in the success of World Broadcasting. His experience there led him to play a founding role in Muzak in the 1930s. In 1934 he was named Vice President of programming at Muzak in New York City. He was musical director of Majestic Records beginning in 1947. At Columbia Records as A&R director and then vice-president, Selvin was in charge of the recordings of Frank Sinatra, Doris Day, Dinah Shore and Buddy Clark in the late 1940s and early 1950s.

He was an A&R director in 1953 at RCA Victor in charge of the company's popular Camden Records label
and served as the musical director for a recording in 1954 with John Serry Sr. (See RCA Thesaurus). In 1956 he served once again as musical director with Serry for another swing jazz album at Dot Records (See Squeeze Play)

After retirement, he became a consultant to 3M, helping them make the transition from vinyl records to audio cassettes.

Selected discography
Popular recordings from Selvin's extensive discography include:
 "The Original Charleston" (the Columbia 78rpm version)
The Knickerbockers (Ben Selvin & His Orch.)
NYC – Apr. 10th, 1925
Voc. vocal breaks by Ben Selvin
Columbia 355–D, mx.140514–1

 "Margie"
Selvin's Novelty Orchestra
NYC – Nov., 1920
Voc. Arthur Hall
Grey Gull L–1036–(a), mx.J–3–10

 "So This Is Venice"
Ben Selvin & His Moulin Rouge Orchestra
NYC – Dec., 1923
Voc. Irving Kaufman
Vocalion A–14757, mx.12641

 "Steppin' in Society" (the Columbia 78 rpm version)
The Knickerbockers
NYC – May 26th, 1925
Columbia 391–D, mx.W–140623–2

 "We'll Have a New Home (In the Morning)"
Ben Selvin & His Orchestra
NYC – Dec. 28th, 1927
Vocs. unidentified trio
Columbia 1274–D, mx.W–145445

 "Happy Days Are Here Again" 
Annette Hanshaw
(Ben Selvin & His Orchestra – vocs. Annette Hanshaw & The Rollickers)
NYC – Feb. 11th, 1930
Diva Records 3106–G; Harmony 1106–H; Velvet Tone 2106–V

 "Dardanella"
(Felix Bernard – Johnny S. Black)
(Six-million seller – No. 1 hit for 13 weeks, 24 in charts)
Selvin's Novelty Orchestra
NYC – Nov. 20th, 1919
Victor 18633–A, mx.23344–3

 "I'm Forever Blowing Bubbles"
(John Kellette – Jaan Kenbrovin)
(No. 1 hit for 4 weeks)
Selvin's Novelty Orchestra
NYC – Jul. 31st, 1919
Victor 18603–A, mx.B–22966–6

 "Manhattan"
(Richard Rodgers – Lorenz Hart)
(No. 1 hit for 4 weeks)
The Knickerbockers
NYC – Jul. 15th, 1925
Columbia 422–D, mx.W–140765

 "Sentimental Me"
(Richard Rodgers – Lorenz Hart)
(No. 2 hit)
The Knickerbockers
NYC – Jul. 15th, 1925
Columbia 422–D, mx.W–140766

 "I Can't Give You Anything but Love, Baby"
(Jimmy McHugh – Dorothy Fields)
(No. 2 hit)
The Knickerbockers
Voc. Vaughn De Leath
NYC – Jun. 1st, 1928
Columbia 1424–D, mx.W–146380

 "You're the Cream in My Coffee"
(Ray Henderson – Buddy DeSylva – Lew Brown)
(No. 2 hit)
Eddie Thomas' Collegians (and/or) The Broadway Nitelites (Ben Selvin & His Orch.) –
Voc. Jack Parker
NYC – Oct. 19th, 1928
Columbia 1604–D, mx.W–147140–3

 "I Only Have Eyes for You"
(Harry Warren – Al Dubin)
(No. 2 hit)
Ben Selvin & His Orchestra
Voc. Howard Phillips
NYC – Jun. 28th, 1934
Columbia 2936–D, mx.152766

Death
Ben Selvin died in July 1980, and was buried at the Mount Hebron Cemetery in New York City.

Bibliography
 Johnson, Richard J., and  Shirley, Bernard H. American Dance Bands on Record and Film 1915–1942. Rustbooks, 2010.
 Rust, Brian. American Dance Discography. Arlington House, 1975.

References

External links 
Ben Selvin and his Orchestra (1920's) performing on archive.org
The Library of Congress - National Jukebox - Ben Selvin's Novelty Orchestra performing on records (1919-1920) on www.loc.gov
Ben Selvin on The European Library.org
Ben Selvin on Bnf.fr
Ben Selvin recordings at the Discography of American Historical Recordings.

1898 births
1980 deaths
American bandleaders
Big band bandleaders
Columbia Records artists
Vocalion Records artists
20th-century American conductors (music)
Burials at Mount Hebron Cemetery (New York City)